M.P. Birla Foundation Higher Secondary School is a private school in Kolkata, West Bengal, India.  It is coeducational and teaches in English. The school started in 1988. It is run by the M.P. Birla Group, the philanthropic wing of the Birla family.

The principal of the school was Mr. Herbert George  whose tenure lasted from 1989-2020. It is located in James Long Sarani, Behala, Kolkata. It follows the CISCE board of education. The school followed CBSE before switching to CISCE.

Founders
Sri Madhav Prasadji Birla (1918 - 1990) and Smt. Priyamvada Devi Birla (1928 - 2004) are the school's founders.

Facilities
 Football field, basketball court, and back field which houses the volley court and facilities for badminton  
 Air conditioned assembly hall cum Auditorium. 
 Physics, chemistry, biology and computer laboratories, and audio visual rooms. 
 Music and dance room. 
 Language room. 
 Educomp Smart Class Program. 
 A well equipped Library to offer a plethora of books. 
 Canteen to offer food at a subsidized rate.

Houses
The school has four houses named after sites of learning in ancient India. They are Nalanda (green), Ujjaini (red), Taxila (yellow) and Vikramshila (blue).

Activities
 The school organises a 2-day exhibition-cum-fete every January which is attended by students, alumni, parents, teachers and staff members. The event alternates with the school cultural program.
 The school has a cricket club named SPECTRUUM which organises inter-school cricket tournament annually. 
 The school even has its own Drama Club known as DRAMACRACY which organises inter-house and even inter-school drama competitions.
 The school has a registered charitable organisation Sparsh,. The organisation promotes social welfare. It organizes an annual inter-school Basketball Tournament Hoops.  
 The school has its own Counter Strike Team, which is the only official clan in Kolkata.  
 Along with the students of South Point, the students of M. P. Birla judge city pandals during Durga Puja. The event is called M. P. Birla Puja Utkarsh Samman.  
 An annual Sports Day is held during the winter season.  
 MPBLITZ and VIBGYOR are the two inter-school fests organized by the school for the senior and junior sections respectively.  
 Every year the alumni meet Milaap is held in school.
 The school celebrated its Silver Jubilee year in session 2012-13.

Trips and Excursions 
The summer vacation is of approximately four weeks duration covering May and June. The Puja vacation is roughly for two weeks, corresponding to the festival in West Bengal, while the winter vacation is of two weeks' duration. Excursions, in the country and abroad, are organized annually to develop confidence and self-esteem in children. Short visits to places of interest in and around Kolkata are organized regularly.

School prayer
The prayers sung in the school assembly are: 
 Yaa Devi Sarva Bhuteshu Shakti Rupena Samsthita, Namastasyai, Namastasyai, Namastasyai Namo Namaha, Yaa Devi Sarva Bhuteshu Shanti Rupena Samsthita, Namastasyai, Namastasyai, Namastasyai Namo Namaha, Yaa Devi Sarva Bhuteshu VIDHYA Rupena Samsthita, Namastasyai, Namastasyai, Namastasyai Namo Namaha 
 Vakratunda mahakaya surya koti sama prabha nirvighnam kurume deva sarva karyesu sarvada 
 Tvameva Mata Ca Pita Tvameva/Tumhi ho Mata, Pita Tumhi ho, Tumhi ho bandhu, sakha Tumhi ho 
 Asato ma sad gamaya 
 Raghupati Raghava Raja Ram 
 Jana Gana Mana

The National Pledge is also recited.

Faculty
Special classes are provided to the weak students, who fail to come up to the school standards. Students who fail to meet the academic standards are provided with mentor teachers who monitor their performance and visit their house to interact with parents.

Notable alumni
Media, arts and entertainment
 Anupam Roy - singer
 Saurav Jha - author
 Sayantani Ghosh - actress
 Tridha Choudhury -Tollywood actress
Politics
 Abhishek Banerjee - leader Of Trinamool Youth Congress

References

External links
  
 The Telegraph (Calcutta), 1 September 2005. Lessons learnt from failure
 The Times of India, 28 September 2003. Students to choose the best
 Institutions run by the MP Group

High schools and secondary schools in West Bengal
Schools in Kolkata
Private schools in Kolkata
High schools and secondary schools in Kolkata
Educational institutions established in 1988
1988 establishments in West Bengal